Willie Beecher (born April 14, 1963) is a former placekicker in the National Football League.

College career
Beecher served as the kicker for the Utah State Aggies for four seasons. He made all 64 extra point attempts and 36 of 54 field goal attempts in his college career and was named to Utah State's All-Century team in 1993.

Professional career
Beecher was signed by the Miami Dolphins after the 1987 NFL Draft but was cut at the end of training camp. He was re-signed by the Dolphins as a replacement player during the 1987 NFL players strike. Beecher made three of four field goal attempts in three games before he was released at the end of the strike. He was signed tot the Buffalo Bills practice squad for the remainder of the season. Beecher was released by the Bills during training camp the following season.

References

1963 births
Living people
Buffalo Bills players
Miami Dolphins players
American football placekickers
Utah State Aggies football players
National Football League replacement players